Eric Dunbar (8 May 1897 – 12 September 1946) was a British hurdler. He competed in the men's 110 metres hurdles at the 1920 Summer Olympics.

References

1897 births
1946 deaths
Athletes (track and field) at the 1920 Summer Olympics
British male hurdlers
British male high jumpers
Olympic athletes of Great Britain
Place of birth missing